Isaac Sparks (1719–1776) was an Irish stage actor.

He was born in Dublin, the younger brother of actor Luke Sparks. He established himself on the Dublin stage in the 1730s, appearing at both the Ransford Street Theatre and Smock Alley and then the Aungier Street Theatre during the 1740s. In 1745 he made his London debut at the Drury Lane Theatre and remained in the company there until 1748. He then returned to Dublin and was part of the Smock Alley company until 1758, before transferring to the new Crow Street Theatre for two years, before again returning to Smock Alley. His also performed widely in Irish provincial theatres, with visits to Belfast, Cork and Limerick amongst others.

In 1769 he was in London at the Haymarket Theatre and also again featured again at Drury Lane. His last known acting appearances were in Dublin at Crow Street in 1771.

References

Bibliography
 Highfill, Philip H, Burnim, Kalman A. & Langhans, Edward A. A Biographical Dictionary of Actors, Actresses, Musicians, Dancers, Managers, and Other Stage Personnel in London, 1660-1800: Volume VIX. SIU Press, 1973.

18th-century Irish people
Irish male stage actors
British male stage actors
18th-century Irish male actors
18th-century British male actors
1719 births
1776 deaths
Male actors from Dublin (city)
Irish emigrants to Great Britain